Ryan Clark may refer to:

 Ryan Clark (American football) (born 1979), NFL football player
 Ryan Clark (actor) (born 1983), Australian former actor, best known for Home and Away and lifeguard
 Ryan Clark (musician) (born 1979), co-founder of the band Demon Hunter
 Ryan Clark (snooker player) (born 1992), English snooker player
 Ryan Clark (footballer) (born 1997), Scottish footballer
 Ryan Clark, creator of the games Incredibots and Crypt of the NecroDancer

See also
 Ryan Clarke (disambiguation)
 Rylan Clark (born 1988), English television personality